Elisa Dalla Valle (born 16 January 1998) is an Italian professional racing cyclist, who currently rides for UCI Women's Continental Team .

References

External links

1998 births
Living people
Italian female cyclists
Place of birth missing (living people)